Srikantha is a mountain of the Garhwal Himalaya in Uttarakhand India. It is 151st highest located entirely within the Uttrakhand. Nanda Devi, is the highest mountain in this category. It lies 5.8 km NW of Gangotri I . Jaonli  lies 12.3 km SSE and it is 18.6 km west of Manda I . It lies 14.4 km NW of Jogin I .

Climbing history	
1st ascent of Srikantha done by Nehru Institute of Mountaineering in Oct. 1971.

On May 16, 1978 A team of ten men led by Milan Sen Gupta from Asansol climbed Srikantha. Further details are not known.

A 12-members all Women’s team led by Chandra Prabha Aitwal climbed Srikantba on September 27, 1997, from Uttarkashi, India. They establishing base camp at 4000 meters near Jangla in the Dudu Bamak and three more camps, the summit was reached via the north ridge. The summitters were Suman Kutiyal, Lata Joshi, Nari Dhami, Radha Rana and Kavita Budhathoki.

Neighboring and subsidiary peaks
Neighboring or subsidiary peaks of Srikantha:
 Gangotri I: 
 Gangotri II: 
 Gangotri III: 
 Jogin II: 
 Thalay Sagar: 
 Manda III: 
 Shivling:

Glaciers and rivers
It stands at the head of Dudu Bamak on the eastern side. The glacier flows from south to north and joins Bhagirathi River  On the Southern side Jaonli Glacier flowing from SE to NW and also joins Bhagirathi river.  Bhagirathi River is one of the main tributaries of river Ganga that later joins Alaknanda River the other main tributaries of river Ganga at Devprayag and became Ganga there after.

See also

 List of Himalayan peaks of Uttarakhand

References

Mountains of Uttarakhand
Six-thousanders of the Himalayas
Geography of Chamoli district